The James Young High School is a secondary school in Dedridge, Livingston, West Lothian, Scotland.  The school opened in 1982 and was named after James Young, who patented the process of extracting oil from coal and shale.

James Young High is a coeducational state school which has over 1100 pupils. The headteacher was Christopher Horne until the 2012–2013 school year when he retired and was replaced by Catrina Hatch. In 2018 she was then replaced by the previous Depute Head teacher P Gallacher. She is assisted by her Depute Headteachers G Hope, C McTiernan and A McKeown. There are also 7 PTCs for Curriculum and 4 PTCs for Pupil Support. The school uniform consists of a white shirt with purple tie and optional jumper.

Catchment schools

The catchment primary schools are: Bankton Primary, Bellsquarry Primary, Dedridge Primary and Williamston Primary.

Facilities

In 2009 the school benefited from a £19 million refurbishment.

Her Majesty's Inspectorate of Education (HMIE Inspection)
In 2005, HMIE undertook an inspection of the school. The inspection found that the school's pastoral care, partnership with parents and vocational guidance were all very below the standard and that the school had developed a "culture of continuous failure".  It identified weaknesses in accommodation and facilities as areas in need of attention, and suggested further improvements in achievement at S1 and S2 levels.

Notable alumni
Martin Scott
Craig Benson

References

External links
Official site
James Young High School's page on Scottish Schools Online

Educational institutions established in 1982
Livingston, West Lothian
Secondary schools in West Lothian
1982 establishments in Scotland